Mid Coast Hospital is a hospital located in Brunswick, Maine. It serves Maine's Midcoast region. The 93-bed facility is an independent, non-profit hospital governed by a community board of directors. Its current president and CEO is Lois Skillings, RN.

Hospital overview 
Mid Coast Hospital was formed after a merger between Bath Memorial Hospital and Regional Memorial Hospital. The hospital opened its modern campus in Cook's Corner in 2001 and then expanded in 2009 with a new emergency department and additional medical/surgical inpatient beds.

Mid Coast Hospital is part of Mid Coast–Parkview Health.

Service area 
Mid Coast Hospital serves surrounding communities including Bath, Brunswick, Topsham, West Bath, Harpswell and the Islands, Phippsburg, Arrowsic, Georgetown, Woolwich, Wiscasset, Alna, Edgecomb, Boothbay, Boothbay Harbor, Dresden, Richmond, Bowdoin, Bowdoinham, Lisbon, Lisbon Falls, Durham, Freeport, North Yarmouth, and Pownal.

Employment 
Mid Coast–Parkview Health is the third-largest employer in the Midcoast region with more than 2,000 employees.

References 
Mid Coast Hospital

Hospital buildings completed in 1991
Hospitals in Maine
Buildings and structures in Brunswick, Maine
1991 establishments in Maine